Heptapterus is a genus of three-barbeled catfishes native to South America.

Species
There are currently 11 recognized species in this genus:

 Heptapterus bleekeri Boeseman, 1953
 Heptapterus fissipinnis A. Miranda-Ribeiro, 1911
 Heptapterus mbya Azpelicueta, Aguilera & Mirande, 2011
 Heptapterus multiradiatus R. Ihering (pt), 1907
 Heptapterus mustelinus (Valenciennes, 1835)
 Heptapterus ornaticeps C. G. E. Ahl, 1936
 Heptapterus qenqo Aguilera, Mirande & Azpelicueta, 2011
 Heptapterus stewarti Haseman, 1911
 Heptapterus sympterygium Buckup, 1988
 Heptapterus tapanahoniensis Mees, 1967
 Heptapterus tenuis Mees, 1986

References

Heptapteridae
Fish of South America
Taxa named by Pieter Bleeker
Catfish genera
Freshwater fish genera